The Sierra de los Cuchumatanes is the highest non-volcanic mountain range in Central America. With an area of  situated above , it is also the most extensive highland region in Central America. The Sierra de los Cuchumatanes is located in western Guatemala in the departments of Huehuetenango and El Quiché. Its western and south-western borders are marked by the Seleguá River, which separates it from the Sierra Madre volcanic chain. Its southern border is defined by the Río Negro, which flows into the Chixoy River, which turns northwards and separates the Cuchumatanes from the mountains in the Alta Verapaz region.

Etymology

The name "Cuchumatán" is derived from the Mam words cuchuj (to join or unite) and matán (with superior force) and means "that which was brought together by superior force". Cuchumatán may also be a derivation of the Nahuatl word kochmatlán, which means "place of the parrot hunters".

Climate

The Cuchumatanes has a variety of different biomes, including pine-oak lower montane and montane humid forest, while lower montane wet forest and neotropic grass- and shrublands are present on higher slopes and plateaus, and subtropical pluvial forest in the northern piemonte.

Some scholars say that the plants of Sierra de los Chuchumatanes are more like the plants in the Andes Mountains in South America than like plants in the rest of Mesoamerica due to the elevation and cool climate.

The area is dominated by páramo grasslands, but there are also stands of juniper and pines and forests of fir trees.  Grazing from the sheep altered the area, causing both soil erosion and the depletion of the area's trees as the sheap feasted on new seedlings.  Today, many of the area's trees grow in places that are too steep for sheep to reach.

Formation

The mountains formed during the Cretaceous Period.  The Altos de Chiantla is a table-shaped land in the Sierra.

History

Historians believe that the Sierra and the Altos de Chiantla had few permanent residents before the Spanish came to Mesoamerica.  They consider it possible that people planted potatoes, then left to live in nearby towns or villages, returning only at need.  Scientists are not sure whether Mesoamericans brought potatoes to the Sierra or whether this did not occur until the Spanish arrived.  It was not until the Spanish conquest, however, that the area came under intense cultivation.  Potato farming either began or intensified, and sheep were introduced.

Economy

People in the Sierra de los Chuchumantanes grow potatoes and raise sheep.  There is little of the maize cultivation that characterizes Mayan communities elsewhere.

There are hundreds of miles of stone fences in the Sierra to restrict the sheep.  People place small soil islands on the tops of the stone fences to grow such plants as  agave.

Many young people leave the Sierra to find work elsewhere.  Some of them come to the United States.  Many send remittances home to their families, who use the money to build pickup trucks and new houses and install irrigation and electricity.  The trucks have allowed locals to seek better markets for their potatoes and wool.

Houses and buildings

Some people still live in Mayan-style houses with thatched roofs.  But with young people sending money home, their families have built cinder block houses.  These houses have roofs made of corrugated metal, and most of them have two stories.  There are fewer rats in cinder block houses than in houses with grass roofs.

The traditional Mayan sweat bath is called a chuj.  It is made of rock or adobe with a live sod roof.  With young people sending money home, their families have built new chuj out of cinder blocks.

Notes

References

External links

Cuchumatanes - BirdLife IBA Factsheet
Todos Santos

Cuchumatanes
Geography of the Huehuetenango Department
Geography of the Quiché Department
Geography of Mesoamerica
Páramos